Filipino singer Kyla has recorded material for nine studio albums and one extended play (EP). She has also collaborated with other artists on duets and featured songs on their respective albums. After signing a record deal with EMI Philippines in 2000, Kyla began to work with producer Chito Ilacad and songwriter Arnie Mendaros, who wrote all of the songs on her debut studio album, Way to Your Heart, which was released later that year. It included the single "Hanggang Ngayon", whose accompanying music video won the International Viewer's Choice Awards for Southeast Asia at the 2001 MTV Video Music Awards. She continued to collaborate with Mendaros on her eponymous second album, which was released in 2002. She was the sole writer of the songs "I'm Into You" and "This Day".

Kyla's third studio album, I Will Be There, was released in May 2003. The title track was written by Ogie Alcasid. The album also featured the song "Flexin", a collaboration with English boy band Blue. She released her fourth studio album, Not Your Ordinary Girl, in October 2004. The lead single, "Human Nature", was a cover of Michael Jackson's 1983 R&B hit. Keith Martin wrote the tracks "Because of You", "Only For You", "Someone To Love", and "When I'm With You", while Jay R and Jimmy Martinez composed the album's title track and the song "Making Me Crazy". Kyla co-wrote the title track of her fifth studio album, Beautiful Days, which was released in 2006. She reunited with Mendaros on the single "Nasaan Ka Na", but also worked with new writers and producers for the project.

Kyla's next two releases—Heartfelt (2007) and Heart 2 Heart (2008)—were cover albums, both of which have since been certified platinum by the Philippine Association of the Record Industry. In 2010, she released her eighth studio album, Private Affair. The lead single, "Don't Tie Me Down", was co-written by Kyla with Jay R, Jimmy Martinez, Billy Crawford, and Kris Lawrence. The album included a remake of the Bee Gees's "How Deep Is Your Love" (2010). She released her debut EP, Journey, in May 2014. One of its tracks, "My Heart", was written by Brian McKnight for Kyla's wedding to basketball player Rich Alvarez in 2011, and was later re-recorded as a duet with McKnight. In December 2016, she signed with Star Music and released her ninth studio album, The Queen of R&B, two years later. She collaborated with other artists, including Yeng Constantino, Jay Durias, and Iñigo Pascual. She has contributed songs to soundtracks: "Even the Nights Are Better" for Since I Found You, "Mahal Ko O Mahal Ako" for Nasaan Ka Nang Kailangan Kita, and "Init sa Lamig" for The Broken Marriage Vow.

Songs

Notes

References

External links
 
 
 

Kyla